Atonsu is a suburb of Kumasi in the Asokwa Municipal District in the Ashanti Region of Ghana. The Oti landfill site is situated in Atonsu.

Atonsu is also a community in the Sekyere Central District in the Ashanti Region of Ghana.

Institutions 

 Adansi Rural Bank Limited
 Atonsu Municipal Assembly Cluster of Schools
 Atonsu Municipal Assembly Primary and JHS
 Atonsu Health Centre

References 

Ashanti Region
Communities in Ghana